Saint Kitts and Nevis elects a legislature on the national level. The National Assembly has fifteen members, eleven members elected for a five-year term in single-seat constituencies, three appointed members and one ex officio member. 
Saint Kitts and Nevis each have a two-party system, which means that there are two dominant political parties, with extreme difficulty for anybody to achieve electoral success under the banner of any other party.

Latest election

See also
 Electoral calendar
 Electoral system

External links
SKNVibes Analyzer for Federal Election Results (through 2015) 
Saint Kitts and Nevis on the Political Database of the Americas
Adam Carr's Election Archive